Events from the year 1716 in Canada.

Incumbents
French Monarch: Louis XV
British and Irish Monarch: George I

Governors
Governor General of New France: Philippe de Rigaud Vaudreuil
Colonial Governor of Louisiana: Antoine de la Mothe Cadillac then Jean-Baptiste Le Moyne de Bienville
Governor of Nova Scotia: Thomas Caulfeild
Governor of Placentia: John Moody

Events
 Jacques Talbot came to Montreal as a schoolmaster.

Births

Deaths

References

 
Canada
16